The Southeastern Conference Softball Coach of the Year is a college softball award given to the Southeastern Conference's most outstanding coach. The award has been given annually since 1997.

Winners

Winners by school

References

Awards established in 1997
Coach
NCAA Division I softball conference coaches of the year